Brave Kid is a Hong Kong based Thoroughbred racehorse.

In the season of 2009-2010, Brave Kid recorded sixth consecutive victory and progressed from Class 4 to Group level. He was one of the nominees for the Hong Kong Horse of the Year award.

References
 The Hong Kong Jockey Club – Brave Kid Racing Record
 The Hong Kong Jockey Club

Racehorses bred in Australia
Racehorses trained in Hong Kong
Hong Kong racehorses